The men's individual competition of the triathlon events at the 2015 Pan American Games will be held on July 12 at the Ontario Place West Channel in Toronto, Ontario, Canada. The defending Pan American Games champion is Reinaldo Colucci of Brazil.

The Pan American Games triathlon contains three components; a  swim,  cycle, and a  run.

The winner qualified to compete in the triathlon competitions at the 2016 Summer Olympics in Rio de Janeiro, Brazil.

Schedule
All times are Eastern Standard Time (UTC-3).

Results

Race
35 competitors from 20 countries were scheduled to compete.

References

Triathlon at the 2015 Pan American Games